Auburn Road can refer to:

Auburn Road, a 19th-century New York railroad, in 1853 absorbed into the New York Central Railroad.
Auburn Road Vineyards, a winery in New Jersey.